Callixalus is a genus frogs in the family Hyperoliidae. It is monotypic, being represented by a single species, Callixalus pictus. It is found in the eastern Democratic Republic of the Congo (including the Itombwe Mountains) and western Rwanda. It is sometimes known as the African painted frog.

Description
Dorsum is warty and chocolate brown to almost black and has many small orange or golden spots. There is no vocal sac; the males appear to be mute.

Habitat and conservation
The natural habitats of Callixalus pictus are high-altitude forests, especially bamboo forests, above  asl but more commonly only above . During the day time they hide in broken bamboo stumps or between the bark and the moss covering tree trunks.

Callixalus pictus is threatened by habitat loss caused by agriculture, livestock farming, wood extraction, and expanding human settlements.

References

Hyperoliidae
Monotypic amphibian genera
Amphibians described in 1950
Frogs of Africa
Amphibians of the Democratic Republic of the Congo
Amphibians of Rwanda
Taxa named by Raymond Laurent
Taxonomy articles created by Polbot